In topology, a branch of mathematics, a collapse reduces a simplicial complex (or more generally, a CW complex) to a homotopy-equivalent subcomplex. Collapses, like CW complexes themselves, were invented by J. H. C. Whitehead. Collapses find applications in computational homology.

Definition

Let  be an  abstract simplicial complex.

Suppose that  are two simplices of  such that the following two conditions are satisfied: 
  in particular 

then  is called a free face. 

If additionally we have  then this is called an elementary collapse. 

A simplicial complex that has a sequence of collapses leading to a point is called collapsible. Every collapsible complex is contractible, but the converse is not true.

This definition can be extended to CW-complexes and is the basis for the concept of simple-homotopy equivalence.

Examples

 Complexes that do not have a free face cannot be collapsible.  Two such interesting examples are R. H. Bing's house with two rooms and Christopher Zeeman's dunce hat; they are contractible (homotopy equivalent to a point), but not collapsible.
 Any n-dimensional PL manifold that is collapsible is in fact piecewise-linearly isomorphic to an n-ball.

See also

References

Algebraic topology
Properties of topological spaces